Abd Allah Ali al-Asghar ibn Al-Husayn (9 Rajab 60 AH – 10 Muharram 61 AH / 10 October 680 CE), or simply Ali al-Asghar ("Younger Ali"), was the newborn child of Al-Husayn (son of ‘Ali, grandson of the Islamic Prophet Muhammad and the third Imam) and Rubab bint Imra’ al-Qays. He was martyred during the Battle of Karbala, and is commemorated in Shi'ism as the "personified quintessence of the innocent victim."

Biography 
He was born in Medina on the 9th of Rajab, 60 AH. His father's other sons were Imam Zayn al-Abidin and ‘Ali al-Akbar. ‘Abdullah's three sisters were Ruqayyah (Sukainah), Fatimah al-Kubra (Sakinah) and Fatimah al-Sughra.

Rubab and her two children, Sakina and Ali Asghar, accompanied Husayn to Karbala. In hagiography about the Battle, Husayn's camp at one time was cut off from water supplies from 7th moharram till Ashura and so Husayn went to Yazid's besieging forces to plead water for the women and children in his camp. Husayn had brought along Ali Asghar for mercy, but Yazid's soldiers then martyred Ali by an arrow to his throat. Shia tradition relates that Ali Asghar was martyred by an opposing soldier named Hurmala with a three-headed arrow, when he moved his neck to stop the arrow from hitting his father. Ali Asghar was only six months old when he died. He is honored by Shias as the youngest person martyred at the Battle of Karbala.

Aftermath 
The massacre at Karbala made Mukhtar al-Thaqafi seek revenge. He led an uprising in which Hurmala and a number of his comrades were killed.

Commemoration 

Ali al-Asghar is buried along with his brother Ali al-Akbar and his father Husayn in Karbala, Iraq, which is now one of the most visited shrines in the world. Ali al-Asghar and his death are commemorated in various ways, including iconographic depictions, hagiography recitations (rowzeh), poetry (nowheh), replicas of Ali Asghar's cradle and grave, and dolls representing him. according to Shia ritual shahadat-e-Ali asghar is on 9th moharram night however, he was killed 71st before imam Husayn. During nowheh, women perform self-flagellating rituals (sineh-sarpay or aza-sarpay) in which they move around (sineh-dowr) a cradle replica and hit their chests with their hands. In Muharram ceremonies and commemorations, Ali al-Asghar is represented as an innocent child suffering unbearable thirst. His death is mourned at length in rawza-khani (recital of the Rawdat ash-Shuhada "The Paradise of the Martyrs") literature and in early ta'ziya (passion play) traditions, a complete majles was dedicated to Ali al-Asghar, with the infant's cradle a conspicuous element on the stage. Ali al-Asghar is also represented in Muharram processions and mourned in folklore.

See also 
 Ibrahim ibn Muhammad
 Ali al-Akbar ibn Husayn
 Battle of Karbala

References

External links 

 Ali Asghar – the youngest martyr of Karbala
 AliAsghar
 Global convent for respect Ali al-Asghar honor

680 births
680 deaths
Family of Muhammad
7th-century Muslims
Murdered Asian children
People killed at the Battle of Karbala
Banu Hashim